Internet-nationalism (also known as cyber-nationalism or online-nationalism) is nationalism which bases its activity on the Internet.
Cyber-nationalism has different aspects, which may help the government as a part of the propaganda.
As a social phenomena, cyber-nationalism is nationalistic groups who are gathering on the internet. They often perform offensive actions against other countries, such as hacking and trying to affect elections. This phenomenon can be found in several countries such as Japan, Russia, and China.

Background 
The Internet makes it easy to communicate without physical borders. Through digitization, people who are living in different counties, can communicate better than before. It is theorized that physical borders, which once prevented homophilous actors from congregating, are absent on the internet, allowing people of like mind to meet and politically or socially mobilize, whereas pre-internet they were unable to.  Others, however, have argued that this idea is idealistic. Users on the internet tend to harbor a strong dislike towards each other, unlike the expectation.

Cyber-war 
Cyber-nationalism is part of the governmental policy. Governments use the internet as a part of propaganda to mobilize people. The Internet has certain advantage to encourage and improve nationalism. It catches more awareness than traditional media such as Newspapers and Television. Moreover, Internet makes it easier to organize activities.

By country

China

In China, cyber-nationalism is very active. Chinese nationalists and the Chinese communist party use the Internet resources available to them (considering that the Internet is restricted in China by censorship and the Great Firewall) to organize online and recruit further supporters. The isolationist view and xenophobic tendency are also consistently ridiculed in this aspect of Chinese cyber nationalism.

Other Chinese nationalists use the Internet to hack, spam, and otherwise influence the technological infrastructure of nations the nationalists consider anti-China, primarily members of the European Union, the United States and Japan. Many Western observers, as well as Chinese dissidents, believe that cyber-nationalist and hacking efforts are aided or organized by the Chinese government. However, there are individuals and organizations who voluntarily carry out their own cyber initiatives to defend their country. In 2016, Little Pink, an organization composed of young digital nationalists, attacked the social media account of Chou Tzu-yu after the Taiwanese pop singer waved Taiwan's flag on a television show.

A number of the cyber nationalist activities are said to be reactive or event-driven and forced by actors or instances when China's national interests are damaged. For instance, there is an increase in anti-American cyber nationalistic movement every time the U.S. elevated its threat level against China. These movements often include cyber attacks such as the case of the China Eagle Club, a hacker organization that carried out the so-called Taiwan Blitz designed to combat Chen Shui-bian's ascent to power.

Japan
In Japan, recently cyber-nationalists (netto-uyoku) have become very active. They communicate with each other on the internet. In 2009, some part of the cyber-nationalist took actions against Korean tourists in the Tsushima Island, which is located near South Korea. Footage of this can be found on YouTube. According to Rumi Sakamoto, "This episode is just one expression of Japan’s new grassroots nationalism, which has gained force over the last decade against the backdrop of increasingly vociferous historical revisionism and neo-nationalism."
In the past these kind of actions would not have raised public awareness, but the internet makes it easy for these groups to get public attention.

Russia
In Russia, nationalist groups use the Internet to solicit donations, recruit and organize. After the Russo-Georgian war, groups on Facebook such as "Abkhazia is not Georgia" and other Internet communities formed. Since many ethnic Russians were worried about terrorism from the Caucasus region, Russian nationalists doxxed students who are studying in Caucasian universities. They also proliferated propaganda videos in which dark-skinned young people are beating up ethnic Russians.

At the same time, anti-Russian government activist groups are recruiting on the Internet. In this case, cyber-nationalism aids in building support for the Chechen Republic and ethnic Chechen people against the Russian state, along with other minority groups that feel marginalized by the Russian Federation under Vladimir Putin.

References

Further reading
 Kondo, R. and A.Tanizaki (2007) Netto-uyoku to sabukaru minshu-shugi [netto-uyoku and subcultural democracy]. Tokyo: San’ichi shobō

Nationalism
Internet culture